Alias the Deacon is a 1927 American silent drama film directed by Edward Sloman and starring Jean Hersholt, June Marlowe and Ralph Graves. It was produced and released by Universal Pictures. Based on a stage play of the same name, it was directed by Edward Sloman and is preserved at the Library of Congress Packard Campus for Audio-Visual Conservation. It was remade as a sound film Alias the Deacon in 1940.

Cast
 Jean Hersholt as George Caswell or The Deacon
 June Marlowe as Phyllis/Mrs. Nancy Blythe
 Ralph Graves as Jim Adams
 Myrtle Stedman as Mrs. Betsy Clark
 Lincoln Plumer as John Cunningham
 Ned Sparks as Slim Sullivan
 Tom Kennedy as Bull Moran
 Maurice Murphy as Willie Clark
 George Westas - George
 Wilson Benge as Minister
 Walter Brennan as Cashier at Cunningham's Rink
 Joseph W. Girard as Sheriff of Morton County
 Annabelle Magnus as Nancy as a Child
 George Periolat as Giuseppi Padroni aka Tony the Dip

Remake
This film was remade in 1940 starring Bob Burns, Mischa Auer, and Peggy Moran.

References

External links
 
 
  lobby poster; Alias the Deacon

1927 films
1927 drama films
Silent American drama films
American films based on plays
American black-and-white films
American silent feature films
Films directed by Edward Sloman
Universal Pictures films
1920s American films